SDC 335.579-0.292 is a dark nebula in the constellation of Norma. It is about 7.8 light-years (2.4 parsecs) in size. Its distance is poorly known, but it is thought to be about 10,000 light-years (3.25 kiloparsecs) away.

SDC 335.579-0.292 is a site where stars are forming. It is one of the most massive such star-forming regions known, with a total mass of over 5,500 solar masses. Inside, there are two massive star-forming cores, one of which has an estimated mass of 545 solar masses. It is thought to be a potential precursor to massive OB associations and massive star clusters, like the famous Trapezium Cluster. It is claimed to live a lifetime of barely a million years.

References

Dark nebulae
Star-forming regions
Norma (constellation)